= Harecourte =

Harecourte is a surname. Notable people with the surname include:

- Michael Harecourte, MP for Tamworth (UK Parliament constituency)
- Robert Harecourte, MP for Tamworth (UK Parliament constituency)
